SSTA may refer to

Scottish Secondary Teachers' Association
Sea Surface Temperature Anomaly
Singapore Space and Technology Association
Statistical Static Timing Analysis
Stockholm Stads Tekniska Aftonskola